The 2019–20 Women's T20 Super League was the second Women's T20 Super League competition that took place in South Africa. It took place in December 2019, with 4 teams taking part made up of the best players in South Africa. Starlights won the competition by topping the round-robin group.

Competition format
The four teams played each other once in a round-robin, therefore playing three matches. Matches were played using a Twenty20 format.

The league worked on a points system with positions being based on the total points. Points were awarded as follows:

Win: 2 points. 
Tie: 1 point. 
Loss: 0 points.
Abandoned/No Result: 1 point.

Squads
The 2019–20 Women's T20 Super League took place two months after the inaugural tournament, with renamed teams.

Points table

Source: CricketArchive

Fixtures

Statistics

Most runs

Source: CricketArchive

Most wickets

Source: CricketArchive

References

Women's T20 Super League
2019 in South African cricket